Shartykey is a rural locality (a selo) in Dzhidinsky District, Republic of Buryatia, Russia. The population was 234 as of 2010.

Geography 
Shartykey is located 40 km southwest of Petropavlovka (the district's administrative centre) by road. Nizhny Torey is the nearest rural locality.

References 

Rural localities in Dzhidinsky District